Timothy Charles Nordbrook (born July 7, 1949, in Baltimore, Maryland) is a former professional baseball player who played six seasons for the Baltimore Orioles, California Angels, Chicago White Sox, Toronto Blue Jays, and Milwaukee Brewers of Major League Baseball. Because he left the Angels in 1976 as a free agent, the Angels were entitled to an extra signing in that year's crop of free agents—the first.

Tim attended Loyola High School in Towson, MD. He was drafted by the Baltimore Orioles in the 9th round (222nd overall) of the 1970 MLB June Amateur Draft Loyola College in Baltimore, MD.

References

External links

1949 births
Living people
American expatriate baseball players in Canada
Asheville Orioles players
Baltimore Orioles players
Baseball players from Baltimore
California Angels players
Chicago White Sox players
Dallas–Fort Worth Spurs players
Indianapolis Indians players
Loyola Greyhounds baseball players
Major League Baseball shortstops
Miami Marlins (FSL) players
Miami Orioles players
Milwaukee Brewers players
Pikeville Brewers players
Rochester Red Wings players
Stockton Ports players
Toronto Blue Jays players
Vancouver Canadians players
Pikeville Cubs players
Minor league baseball managers